William Ogle may refer to:

 William Ogle, 1st Viscount Ogle (died 1670), English soldier and politician
 William Ogle Carr (1802–1856), ninth Chief Justice of Ceylon and eighth King's Advocate of Ceylon
 Sir William Ogle (1823–1885), fifth of the Ogle baronets 
 William Ogle (physician) (1827–1912), English physician, classicist and statistician
 William Wallis Ogle (active 19th century), member of the Ogle family

See also
 John William Ogle (1824-1905), English physician